Shave may refer to:
to shave refers to the act of shaving
Shave (surname)
Shave (magazine), a periodical magazine
"Shave", a song by Enon from their 2003 album Hocus Pocus
 Severe Hazards Analysis and Verification Experiment, a database of storm impact based on telephone surveys